Penygroes railway station was located in Penygroes, Gwynedd, Wales.

The narrow gauge, horse-drawn Nantlle Railway had a station near the site from 1856. From the outset timetables appeared regularly in the "Carnarvon & Denbigh Herald" and in Bradshaw from October 1856. In 1865 the narrow gauge line was closed, to be replaced and updated to standard gauge with contemporary facilities. It reopened in its eventual form in 1867 and closed in December 1964.

When the line and station were first opened in 1867 a locomotive was hired from the Cambrian Railways. On the return journey the loco ran short of coal and ran out of steam at Penygroes. There was some peat in a nearby field, which the crew dug and the directors carried to the engine enabling steam to be raised.

The passenger service along the Nantlle Branch was withdrawn in 1932, though excursions continued until 1939. The station and line closed on 7 December 1964 as recommended in the Beeching Report. The station building and footbridge remained in place, but increasingly derelict, until at least 1970.

References

Sources

Further material

External links
 The station site on a navigable OS Map, via National Library of Scotland
 The station and line, via Rail Map Online
 The line CNV with mileages, via Railway Codes
 Images of the station, via Yahoo
 The station, via Nantlle Valley History
 The station and line, via LNWR Society
 By DMU from Pwllheli to Amlwch, via Huntley Archives

Beeching closures in Wales
Disused railway stations in Gwynedd
Llanllyfni
Railway stations in Great Britain opened in 1867
Railway stations in Great Britain closed in 1964
Former London and North Western Railway stations